Foiano di Val Fortore is a comune (municipality) in the Province of Benevento in the Italian region of Campania, located about  northeast of Naples and about  northeast of Benevento.

Foiano di Val Fortore borders the following municipalities: Baselice, Molinara, Montefalcone di Val Fortore, Roseto Valfortore, San Bartolomeo in Galdo, San Giorgio La Molara, San Marco dei Cavoti.

References

External links
 Official website

Cities and towns in Campania